cAMP-specific 3',5'-cyclic phosphodiesterase 4D is an enzyme that in humans is encoded by the PDE4D gene.

Function 

The PDE4D gene is complex and has at least 9 different isoforms that encode functional proteins. These proteins degrade the second messenger cAMP, which is a key signal transduction molecule in multiple cell types, including vascular cells (Dominiczak and McBride, 2003).[supplied by OMIM]

Interactions 

PDE4D has been shown to interact with myomegalin and GNB2L1.

Clinical relevance
Mutations in this gene have been associated to cases of acrodysostosis.

This is the subtype of PDE4 that appears to be involved in the emetic and antidepressant effects of PDE4 inhibitors.

Furthermore, changes in expression of the isoform PDE4D7 have been proposed as prostate cancer biomarker.

References

Further reading